The Broad stingray (Bathytoshia lata), also known as the  Brown stingray or Hawaiian stingray, is a species of stingray in the family Dasyatidae. At night, this species actively forages for bottom-dwelling invertebrates and bony fishes, often near the boundaries of reefs. Reproduction is aplacental viviparous. As  substantial threats to its population do not seem to exist, IUCN has listed this species as least concern.

Taxonomy and phylogeny
American zoologist Samuel Garman described the Broad stingray in an 1880 issue of the scientific journal Bulletin of the Museum of Comparative Zoology, giving it the name Trygon lata from the Latin word for "broad". Subsequent authors synonymized Trygon with Dasyatis.

Lisa Rosenberger's 2001 phylogenetic analysis of 14 Dasyatis species, based on morphological characters, found that the sister species of the broad stingray is the roughtail stingray (D. centroura), and that they form a clade with the southern stingray (D. americana) and the longtail stingray (D. longa). As D. centroura is found in the Atlantic, this suggests that it and D. lata evolutionarily diverged before or with the formation of the Isthmus of Panama (about  3 million years ago).

Distribution and habitat
Bathytoshia lata occurs in the Atlantic and the Indo-Pacific from southern Africa to the Hawaiian Islands  and is also found in the Mediterranean Sea  with occasional records from Spain to Turkey. 

This species is common in coastal bays with mud or silt bottoms, and may also be encountered in sandy areas or near coral reefs. It is most common at depths between 40-200 m but is found as far down as 800 m.

Description

The broad stingray has a diamond-shaped pectoral fin disc a fourth wider than long, with nearly straight leading margins that converge at an obtuse angle, and curved trailing margins. The tip of the snout is rounded and protrudes past the disc. The mouth is arched and contains five or six papillae on the floor, two of which are in front of the others. The pelvic fins are short and rounded. The whip-like tail is twice or more  the length of the disc, and bears a serrated stinging spine on the upper surface near the tail base. A long, narrow fin fold occurs beneath the tail, which eventually becomes a keel that runs all the way to the tail tip.

Larger rays have three large, elongated tubercles in the middle of the back; the tail is roughened by small dermal denticles, along with an irregular row of conical tubercles on each side and several large, flattened tubercles in front of the spine. This species is plain olive to brown above and white below. Though rarely found so far west, the similar-looking diamond stingray (D. dipterura) is the only other nearshore stingray that occurs off Hawaii; it can be distinguished from this species by its tail, which is shorter and has both upper and lower fin folds.

Biology and ecology

During the day, the broad stingray is relatively inactive and spends much time lying half-buried on the bottom. Rays were most active 2 hours after sunset and before sunrise, and were more active in the higher water temperatures of summer than winter. The behavior of this species was not significantly influenced by tides, likely because they inhabit deeper water.

The broad stingray feeds mainly on bottom-dwelling crustaceans, while also taking polychaete worms and small bony fishes. It excavates large pits to uncover buried prey, and is often followed by opportunists such as jacks. Foraging rays favor areas close to reef boundaries, where many parrotfish, wrasses, gobies, and other reef fishes shelter at night. Known parasites of this species include the tapeworms Acanthobothrium chengi, Rhinebothrium hawaiiensis, Pterobothrium hawaiiensis, Prochristianella micracantha, and Parachristianella monomegacantha. Like other stingrays, the broad stingray is aplacental viviparous. Kaneohe Bay appears to be a nursery area for this species, where juvenile scalloped hammerheads (Sphyrna lewini) and it are the dominant predators.

Human interactions
The International Union for the Conservation of Nature has assessed the broad stingray as of least concern, as it faces no obvious threats from human activity and its range overlaps with several marine protected areas. This species has become a popular subject for display at public aquariums and resorts.

References

Dasyatis
Fish described in 1880